Oxymeris maculata, common name the marlinspike auger,  is a species of sea snail, a marine gastropod mollusc in the family Terebridae, the auger snails.

Distribution
This species occurs in the Red Sea and in the Indian Ocean off Aldabra, Chagos, Madagascar, the Mascarene Basin, Mauritius and Tanzania; in the Pacific Ocean off Mexico; also off Papua New Guinea.

References

 Bratcher T. & Cernohorsky W.O. (1987). Living terebras of the world. A monograph of the recent Terebridae of the world. American Malacologists, Melbourne, Florida & Burlington, Massachusetts. 240pp.
 Severns, M. (2011). Shells of the Hawaiian Islands - The Sea Shells. Conchbooks, Hackenheim. 564 pp

External links
 Linnaeus, C. (1758). Systema Naturae per regna tria naturae, secundum classes, ordines, genera, species, cum characteribus, differentiis, synonymis, locis. Editio decima, reformata [10th revised edition, vol. 1: 824 pp. Laurentius Salvius: Holmiae]
 Fedosov, A. E.; Malcolm, G.; Terryn, Y.; Gorson, J.; Modica, M. V.; Holford, M.; Puillandre, N. (2020). Phylogenetic classification of the family Terebridae (Neogastropoda: Conoidea). Journal of Molluscan Studies. 85(4): 359-388

Terebridae
Gastropods described in 1758
Taxa named by Carl Linnaeus